The Newport Railway Museum is located on Champion Road, Newport, Victoria, near the North Williamstown station.

History
The museum opened on 10 November 1962, after the Australian Railway Historical Society (ARHS) Victorian Division was allocated space at Newport Workshops by the Victorian Railways to develop a collection of key examples of steam locomotives that were then in the process of being replaced by diesel and electric locomotives. By the late 1980s, the early diesel and electric locomotives that had replaced steam traction were themselves nearing end of life, and the museum expanded its collection to incorporate a number of key examples.

Following a safety audit by VicTrack, the landlord and owner of most of the exhibits, the museum closed in February 2010. After various improvements, it reopened in March 2014.

On 16 June 2020, it was announced that the ARHS had withdrawn from the operation of the museum and a new group, Newport Railway Museum Inc., formed by museum volunteers, had entered into an arrangement with VicTrack to take over the Museum site lease. 

In 2016, a project was announced to construct a  roof canopy over four wooden passenger carriages and three of the oldest steam locomotives on the site; this project was completed in 2017. In 2019, the Victorian Government announced a project to construct a roof canopy to protect the heritage-listed locomotive H220 Heavy Harry. A  structure that covered H220 and several adjacent exhibits was completed in 2020. In announcing the completion of the second roof canopy, Newport Railway Museum stated its intention to continue to construct further roofing over remaining exhibits to ensure their preservation.

The museum's regular opening hours are between 12 noon and 5 pm on Saturdays. During school holiday periods, the museum opens on both Saturdays and Sundays, between 12 noon and 5 pm.

Collection
The museum contains the largest existing collection of Victorian Railways steam locomotives, a wide range of other Victorian Railways rolling stock, and numerous Victorian Railways artefacts. The collection includes:

 seventeen steam locomotives
 eight diesel locomotives
 two electric locomotives and four electric suburban carriages
 five country/interstate passenger carriages
 ten freight wagons and two guards vans
 five railway cranes
 rail tractors and postal trolleys
 a signal box 
 an O scale model railway

Steam Locomotives

Diesel Locomotives

Electric Rollingstock

Passenger Carriages

Vans

Freight wagons

Other items

Gallery

References

External links

Railway museums in Victoria (Australia)
1962 establishments in Australia
Museums in Melbourne
Buildings and structures in the City of Hobsons Bay